Lokmanya Tilak Municipal Medical College and General Hospital is a full-fledged Government medical college located in Mumbai, Maharashtra. The college imparts the degree Bachelor of Medicine and Bachelor of Surgery (MBBS). It is recognised by the Medical Council of India. This is one of the oldest medical colleges in Mumbai. Lokmanya Tilak municipal medical college hospital is also locally known as Sion Hospital.

History

It was started in 1947 with 10 beds initially, which has now grown into multi-speciality hospital with more than 1,400 beds. In the same campus, it is attached to Lokmanya Tilak Municipal Medical College (LTMMC) which is a teaching institute for undergraduate and post graduate studies in medical sciences. It is named after Lokmanya Tilak, an eminent Maharashtrian freedom fighter in pre-independence India. It is surrounded by Sulochana Shetty Road, Near Bhau Daji Circle, sided by Eastern Express Highway (National Highway Number 3). Dr. Mohan Joshi is the current Dean of Lokmanya Tilak Municipal General Hospital and Medical College

This hospital at a unique situation and is the first major referral hospital and caters to all trauma and disasters from both major highways. Started as a fifty bedded hospital and single OPD, in a military hospital, has grown to more than 1400 beds and planning to expand over few years more rapidly. Currently with 300 senior staff members and 550 postgraduate students, it takes care of around 16 lakhs OPD patients and more than 60000 admissions per year. It provides services in all specialties and many super-specialties. With Many Intensive care units and special clinics, it takes care of complex health problems at very affordable cost. It has special clinics on Learning disability, Hemato-oncology, Thalassemia and Stem cell therapy.  Over last 65 years it is offering services to the under privileged sections of the society.

Achievements

The main strength of Lokmanya Tilak Municipal General Hospital has been the efficient ‘Trauma Care Centre’ and emergency Medical services center with the state-of-the-art equipment and facilities.  It was the first Trauma Service in India, which has been on a constant ‘state of alert’ for disasters.

This hospital is a nodal center amongst the medical services of the Disaster management plan in the civic context.

It has many human milk banks,

The hospital has the first human milk bank in India.

First skin bank in India.

The first emergency coronary stenting service was started here.

On 30 November 1964 Lokmanya Tilak Medical College was established with the first batch of 60 students. At present LTMMC enrolls 200 MBBS students per year and has more than 150 Post Graduate students per year in various subjects and is preferred choice amongst students.

References

Hospitals in Mumbai
Hospitals established in 1947
Memorials to Bal Gangadhar Tilak
Municipal hospitals in India
Medical colleges in Maharashtra
Universities and colleges in Maharashtra
Educational institutions established in 1947
1947 establishments in India
Affiliates of Maharashtra University of Health Sciences